Amolak Rathan Kohli (born 3 November 1942) is a former governor of the Indian state of Mizoram. He served as governor of Mizoram from 2001 to 2006.

Kohli is an alumnus of Indian Institute of Management Calcutta, a graduate from its first MBA batch. He had topped the all India entrance test to gain admission to the prestigious business school. Kohli also has a Master's degree in Chemistry from Kurukshetra University.

With wide corporate experience in various fields, Mr. Kohli is respected as an eminent educator and human resource trainer who has been involved in the establishment of various educational institutions and programmes in India. His son, Nalin Kohli, is a lawyer, and a BJP spokesman since 2013.

References

External links
Mizoram Government website

Governors of Mizoram
Living people
1942 births
Indian business executives
Businesspeople from Punjab, India
Kurukshetra University alumni
Indian Institute of Management Calcutta alumni